The Housing Act 1930, 20 & 21 George 5 c.39,  otherwise known as the Greenwood Act, is an Act of Parliament in the United Kingdom. It encouraged mass slum clearance and councils to set to work to demolish poor quality housing and replace it with new build. Subsidies for general housing, were given, these were calculated on the number of people rehoused not the number of properties demolished. 'Back to back' housing had finally ended.

Context
The recession was ending: this was an Act of a Labour government, The minister to steer it through the house was Arthur Greenwood.

References

External links

 Text of the Housing Act 1930
 Parliamentary Debates on the Housing Act 1930 in Hansard

United Kingdom Acts of Parliament 1930
Housing legislation in the United Kingdom